Xystus was the Greek architectural term for the covered portico of the gymnasium, in which the exercises took place during the winter or in rainy weather. The Romans applied the term to the garden walk in front of the porticoes, which was divided into flower beds with borders of box, and to a promenade between rows of large trees.

The term xystus derives from the Greek word xustos, meaning "smooth", due to the polished floor of the xystus. "Xystus" was used, by extension, to refer to the whole building containing the gymnasium and portico, as in the xysti of Jerusalem and Elis. Xyst is an alternative spelling for xystus, and xystarch as the term for a superintendent of a xystus. In Latin, xystum is the accusative case of the nominative xystus; in modern architecture, xystum has a different meaning from xystus.

Notable xysti
The Xystus of Jerusalem was a famous building erected in the Judaeo-Hellenistic period probably under Herodian rule.
The Xystus of Elis was a famous gymnasium consisting of a vast enclosure surrounded by a wall. The gymnasium was by far the largest in ancient Greece, because all the athletes in the Olympic Games were required to undergo one month's training there prior to the opening of the games. Within the Xystus, there were special places for runners; these places were separated from each other by plane trees.

Notes

References

Architectural elements
Ancient Greek architecture